The Arc at Old Colony (Old Colony Building until 2015) is a 17-story landmark building in the Chicago Loop community area of Chicago, Illinois. Designed by the architectural firm Holabird & Roche in 1893–94, it stands at approximately 215 feet (65.5 m) and was the tallest building in Chicago at the time it was built. The building was designated a Chicago Landmark on July 7, 1978. It was the first tall building to use a system of internal portal arches as a means of bracing the structure against high winds.

The building was added to the National Register of Historic Places in 1976.  It is directly across the street to the west of the Harold Washington Library.  The address of the Old Colony Building is 407 S. Dearborn Street.

Built as an office building, the Old Colony was converted to an apartment building in 2015. The building was fully remodeled and modernized upon the opening of the apartments, providing residents with vibrant amenities, stylish public areas, and contemporary design. The units are marketed to college students attending school in the South Loop.

Notes

External links

Chicago Landmarks Page
Emporis Page

Residential skyscrapers in Chicago
Commercial buildings on the National Register of Historic Places in Chicago
Office buildings completed in 1893
Apartment buildings in Chicago
Chicago school architecture in Illinois
Chicago Landmarks
1983 establishments in Illinois